Siva Manasula Sakthi is a Tamil-language drama starring Vikram Shri and Tanuja Gowdaa. The series is the official remake of Hindi drama Tu Sooraj Main Saanjh, Piyaji. It replaced the slot of Pagal Nilavu.

Synopsis
Sakthi (Thanuja Gowda) marries Siva (Vikramshri) with the purpose of winning her ancestral property back from him. With external forces working against them, will they ever find love in their hateful relationship forms the rest of the story.

Cast

Main
 Vikram Shri as Shiva
 Tanuja Gowdaa as Sakthi
 Veena Ponappa as Bairavi

Supporting
 Abinavya (Abirami) as Sathya
 Fouzil Hidhayah as Aasha
 Janani Pradeep as Nithya
 Sai Gayathri Buvanesh as Rekha
 Raghul Kanagaraj as Maruthi
 Premalatha as Shiva's mother
 Prakash Rajan as Durga's husband
 Manikandan as Kannan, Rekha's love interest
 Ganesh as Siddhu, Sathya's love interest
 Ranjini as Durga
 Sathya as Rajan, Bhairavi's husband (Antagonist)
 Latha as Rajalakshmi , Sakthi's grandmother
 K. Natraj as Ramamoorthy
 Issac Varkees as Sivanyanam Thambiyyar
 Yogesh Gopi as  Doctor Aakash, Sivananyam's son
 Rithika as Archana, Sivananyam's daughter
 Thanuja Krishnappa as Deivanayaki, Sivanyanam's sister (Antagonist)
 Sangeetha as Bhavani, Sivanyanam's wife

Former Cast
 Nithyalakshmi as Sathya 
 Anirudh as Aditya
 Sanjay as Young Shiva
 VJ Pappu as Sakthi's love interest 
 Girish as Senathipathi (Shiva's father)

Casting
Kannada TV actress Thanuja Gowda was selected to play female lead role as Sakthi. Kannada actor Vikramshri makes his Tamil serial debuts male lead as Siva. Official teaser has been released in YouTube on 9 December 2018.

References

External links
official website at Hotstar
Siva Manasula Sakthi at IMDb

Star Vijay original programming
2019 Tamil-language television series debuts
Tamil-language television shows
Tamil-language television series based on Hindi-language television series